Luis Amigó Catholic University is a private Catholic university located in Medellín, the second-largest city of Colombia. The university also has offices in Apartadó, Bogotá, Cali, Manizales, and Montería.

References

External links

Universities and colleges in Colombia
Education in Medellín
Educational institutions established in 1984
1984 establishments in Colombia
Catholic universities and colleges in Colombia